Muhd Firas Bin Muhd Irwan (born 1 January 2001), commonly known as Firas Irwan, is a Singaporean footballer currently playing as a midfielder for Albirex Niigata Singapore.

Career statistics

Club
.

Notes

References

2001 births
Living people
Singaporean footballers
Association football midfielders
Singapore Premier League players
Woodlands Wellington FC players
Albirex Niigata Singapore FC players